The US Open men's singles championship is an annual tennis tournament that is part of the US Open and was established in 1881. It is played on outdoor hard courts at the USTA Billie Jean King National Tennis Center in Flushing Meadows – Corona Park, New York City, United States. The US Open is played during a two-week period in late August and early September, and has been chronologically the last of the four Grand Slam tournaments of the tennis season since 1987. Newport (1881–1914), Forest Hills (1915–1920, 1924–1977), and Philadelphia (1921–1923) held the event before it settled in 1978 at the USTA National Tennis Center, now the USTA Billie Jean King National Tennis Center, in New York City. The inaugural tournament, in 1881, was reserved for United States National Lawn Tennis Association (USNLTA) club members, before the championships opened to international competitors in 1882.  The USTA is the national body that organizes this event.

History
The men's singles' rules have undergone several changes since the first edition. From 1884 to 1911, the event started with a knockout phase, the All-Comers singles, whose winner faced the defending champion in a challenge round. The All-Comers winner was awarded the title six times (1888, 1893, 1898, 1901, 1904, 1907) in the absence of the previous year's champion. The challenge round system was abolished with the 1912 edition. From 1908 to 1914, when the championships were held at Newport, men's singles draws had exceeded 128 players, but when the event moved to Forest Hills in 1915 entries would be "submitted by clubs, thereby making the clubs weed out mediocre players.  Furthermore, the entry fee would be set high enough to prevent cheapskates from entering just to get a seat at the tournament at a lower price and then defaulting". Since 1881, all matches but the All-Comers final and the challenge round were played as the best-of-three sets, before the event switched to best-of-five for all rounds in 1886. Best-two-out-of-three-sets matches were reintroduced for early rounds in 1917, from 1943 to 1945, and from 1975 to 1978. Before 1884, the winner of the next game at five-games–all took the set in every match except the All-Comers final and the challenge round, which were won by the player who had at least six games and at least two games more than his opponent. This advantage format was introduced for the final sets of early rounds in 1884, and used for all sets in all rounds from 1887 to 1969. The tie-break system was introduced in 1970 for all sets, in its best-of-nine points sudden death version until 1974, and in its best-of-13 points lingering death version since 1975. In addition, the US Open was the first slam to have a fifth set tie-break.

The court surface changed twice, from grass (1881–1974), to Har-Tru clay (1975–1977), to DecoTurf hard courts, since 1978.  The only man to win on all three surfaces, which are grass, Har-Tru clay, and DecoTurf hard was Jimmy Connors.

The champion receives a full-size replica of the event's trophy engraved with his name. In 2010, the winner received prize money of US$1,700,000. A bonus pool of $1,000,000 is also to US Open champions who have clinched the first place of the US Open Series.

In the U.S. National Championships, Richard Sears (1881–1887), William Larned (1901–1902, 1907–1911) and Bill Tilden (1920–1925, 1929) hold the record for most titles in the men's singles, with seven victories each. Four of Sears' wins and all of Larned's, came within the challenge round format, and they won respectively only thrice and twice after going through a complete draw. Sears also holds the all-time record for most consecutive titles, with seven from (1881 to 1887); the first win came when the event was closed to foreign participants. Without the challenge round, the record stands at six, and is held by Tilden (1920–1925).

During the US Open, since the inclusion of the professional tennis players, Jimmy Connors (1974, 1976, 1978, 1982–1983), Pete Sampras (1990, 1993, 1995–1996, 2002), and Roger Federer (2004–2008) have won the most championships, with five titles.  Federer has had the most consecutive wins, with five (2004–2008).

Champions

United States National Championships

US Open

Statistics

Multiple champions
 Years in italic type denote titles defended in the challenge round.
(*) denotes event only for USNLTA club members only

Champions by country

See also

US Open other competitions
List of US Open women's singles champions
List of US Open men's doubles champions 
List of US Open women's doubles champions
List of US Open mixed doubles champions

Grand Slam men's singles
List of Australian Open men's singles champions
List of French Open men's singles champions
List of Wimbledon gentlemen's singles champions
List of Grand Slam men's singles champions

Other events
United States Amateur Tennis Championships
U.S. Pro Tennis Championships

Notes

References
General

Specific

External links
US Open official website

Men
Lists of male tennis players